Nara is one of the 51 union councils of Abbottabad District in the Khyber-Pakhtunkhwa province of Pakistan.

References

Union councils of Abbottabad District